Sarasson is a French dairy product resembling fromage blanc made from buttermilk. It is traditionally produced in the French departments of Loire, Ardèche, Haute-Loire and Puy-de-Dôme. In the 1600 textbook of agriculture , Olivier de Serres mentions the product.

See also
 List of dairy products

References

French cheeses
Occitan cheeses
Massif Central